Grindleford railway station serves the village of Grindleford in the Derbyshire Peak District, in England, although the station is about a mile way, the nearest village being Nether Padley.

History
It was opened in  1894 on the Midland Railway's Dore and Chinley line (now the Hope Valley Line), at the western entrance to the Totley Tunnel.

The line opened up the previously isolated valley to day-trippers to Padley Gorge and commuters from Sheffield, and the transport of stone from the local quarries. The station buildings still exist and have become home to a popular and well-known café.

Stationmasters

Samuel Hart 1896 - 1902 (afterwards station master at Chinley Junction)
Harry l’Anson 1902 - 1907 (afterwards station master at Bakewell)
Samuel Smithurst 1907 -1932 (formerly station master at Killamarsh)
R.J. Dowthwaite from 1932 (also station master at Hathersage)

Facilities
The station is unstaffed and had no ticket provision until 2018, but operator Northern has now installed ticket vending machines here and made the intermediate stations between New Mills and Sheffield part of a penalty fare scheme.  Standard waiting shelters are provided on both platforms and train running information is offered via CIS displays, automated announcements, a pay phone and timetable posters.  Step-free access is available for westbound trains only (platform 1), as the ramps to the bridge linking the platforms are steep and not suitable for wheelchairs.

Service

The typical off-peak service from the station is one train per hour to Sheffield and one to Manchester Piccadilly.

On Sundays there is a train every two hours in each direction for most of the year, but a near-hourly service operates from May to September.

Trains from Sheffield take around 15 minutes, and trains from Manchester Piccadilly take around one hour.

East Midlands Railway call here with the first service of the day to Manchester and also on the final return working. All other services are provided by Northern Trains.

References

External links

 Friends of Grindleford Station

Railway stations in Derbyshire
DfT Category F2 stations
Former Midland Railway stations
Railway stations in Great Britain opened in 1894
Railway stations served by East Midlands Railway
Northern franchise railway stations